Bashabi Fraser  (born 1954) is an Indian-born Scottish academic, editor, translator, and writer. She is a Professor Emerita of English and Creative Writing at Edinburgh Napier University and an Honorary Fellow at the Centre for South Asian Studies at the University of Edinburgh and an Honorary Fellow of the Association of Literary Studies (ALS), Scotland, and a former Royal Literary Fund Fellow. She has authored and edited 23 books, published several articles and chapters, both academic and creative and as a poet.

Early life and education 
Born in Purulia, West Bengal, India, Bashabi Fraser moved to the United Kingdom when she was young. Her mother Anima was awarded a scholarship to the London School of Economics and her father Bimalendu Bhattacharya became the first Commonwealth Scholar from India hosted in the UK. A friend of Fraser's parents in the UK, Julian Dakin, would bring books for her and read them with her. Fraser would write poetry for him and he would later enter the poems for the Commonwealth Scholar Award, without her parents' knowledge, which resulted in Fraser winning its first prize.

Fraser returned to India where her parents worked at the newly opened North Bengal University. She attended St. Helen's Convent, Kurseong in Darjeeling and later earned a BA in English from Lady Brabourne College, University of Calcutta and an MA in English from Jadavpur University, both in Kolkata. She pursued a PhD in English from the University of Calcutta and University of Edinburgh, Scotland as a Commonwealth Fellow. She was introduced to her future husband, Neil, while completing her PhD at the University of Edinburgh. She moved to Edinburgh following their wedding.

Career 
Fraser was Professor of English and Creative Writing at Edinburgh Napier University and became Professor Emerita at the institution after retirement. She is co-founder and director of the Scottish Centre of Tagore Studies (ScoTs). She is an Honorary Fellow at the Centre for South Asian Studies at the University of Edinburgh and an Honorary Fellow of the Association of Literary Studies (ALS), Scotland, and a former Royal Literary Fund Fellow.

Fraser specialises in postcolonial literature and theory. Her profile on the ScoTs website states that "Her research and writing reflect her interest in diasporic themes: the intermeshings of culture and identity, of dislocation and relocation, of belonging and otherness, of memory and nostalgia, of third space and hybridity and of conflicts and freedoms." She is chief editor of Gitanjali and Beyond, an academic and creative peer-reviewed online journal associated with ScoTs, and is on the editorial board of WritersMosaic, a platform for writers of colour which is an initiative of the Royal Literary Fund.

Honors and awards 
Fraser was appointed a Commander of the Order of the British Empire in the 2021 New Year Honours for services to education, culture and cultural integration in Scotland, in particular her projects linking Scotland and India. The Saltire Society named her an Outstanding Woman of Scotland in 2015.

Works

As author

As editor

References

External links 
 

Living people
1954 births
Scottish women poets
Scottish women academics
Academics of Edinburgh Napier University
Lady Brabourne College alumni
University of Calcutta alumni
Jadavpur University alumni
Alumni of the University of Edinburgh
Commanders of the Order of the British Empire
People from Purulia district